was a town located in Kitauonuma District, Niigata Prefecture, Japan. It is famous for its snowy ski resort.

As of 2003, the town had an estimated population of 12,735 and a density of 423.93 persons per km². The total area was 30.04 km².

On November 1, 2004, Koide, along with the town of Horinouchi, and the villages of Hirokami, Irihirose, Sumon and Yunotani (all from Kitauonuma District), was merged to create the city of Uonuma.

Climate 
Koide has a humid subtropical climate (Köppen Cfa) that borders on a humid continental climate, with four distinct seasons. Winters are cool and extremely snowy due to its location in a mountainous valley, while summers are hot and humid.

Transportation

Railway
 JR East - Jōetsu Line

 JR East - Tadami Line
Koide

Highway

Natives of Koide
 Ken Watanabe

See also
 Uonuma

Dissolved municipalities of Niigata Prefecture
Uonuma, Niigata